The 1970 New South Wales Open, also known by its sponsored name Dunlop Open, was a combined men's and women's tennis tournament played on outdoor grass courts at the White City Stadium in Sydney, Australia. The tournament was held from 16 March through 22 March 1970. It was the 78th edition of the event and the second held in the Open era of tennis. The men's event consisted of a singles and doubles competition while the women only played a singles competition. The singles titles were won by Billie Jean King and Rod Laver who were both seeded first. It was Laver's second singles title after 1961 and he won AUS$5,000 first-prize money.

Finals

Men's singles
 Rod Laver defeated  Ken Rosewall 3–6, 6–2, 3–6, 6–2, 6–3

Women's singles
 Billie Jean King defeated  Margaret Court 6–2, 4–6, 6–3

Men's doubles
 Ken Rosewall /  Fred Stolle defeated  Bill Bowrey /  Roger Taylor 6–3, 7–5

References

External links
 Official website
 Association of Tennis Professionals (ATP) tournament profile
 Women's Tennis Association (WTA) tournament profile

Sydney International
New South Wales Open
New South Wales Open
New South Wales Open, 1970